Chi Carinae, Latinised from χ Carinae, is a star in the southern constellation of Carina. It is a third-magnitude star and is one of the brighter members of the constellation. This star is a suspected astrometric binary, although nothing is known about the companion.

This is a massive star, with about seven times the mass of the Sun. The spectrum of this star matches a stellar classification of B3 IV, with the luminosity class of IV indicating this is likely a subgiant star that has nearly exhausted the supply of hydrogen at its core and is in the process of evolving into a giant star.

In 1969, Chi Carinae was classified as chemically peculiar Ap star because its absorption lines of silicon appeared unusually strong relative to the lines for helium. However, subsequent examination in the ultraviolet band showed the silicon bands were as expected and it was determined the spectra is normal for a star of its type. There is no indication of variability in the star's spectrum. Observation during the Hipparcos mission showed no photometric variability down to a limit of ±0.003 magnitude. For this reason, the star has been ruled out as a Beta Cephei-type variable star.

References

Carinae, Chi
B-type subgiants
Carina (constellation)
065575
003117
038827
PD-52 1343
Astrometric binaries